The 2002 Big East men's basketball tournament took place at Madison Square Garden in New York City. Its winner received the Big East Conference's automatic bid to the 2002 NCAA tournament. It is a single-elimination tournament with four rounds and the two highest seeds in each division received byes in the first round. The six teams with the best conference records in each division were invited to participate for a total of 12 teams. Teams were seeded by division. Connecticut and Pittsburgh had the best regular season conference records and received the East #1 seed and West #1 seed, respectively.

Connecticut defeated Pittsburgh in the championship game 74–65 in double overtime to win its fifth Big East tournament championship.

Bracket

Note: By finishing in last place during the regular season in their respective divisions, Virginia Tech and West Virginia did not qualify for the tournament.

Championship game

Caron Butler, the tournament MVP, gave Connecticut the lead for good at 66–64 on a turnaround jumper with 1:59 left in the second overtime, and Pittsburgh fell to the Huskies in two overtimes, 74–65. After Ben Gordon was tied up with two seconds left on the shot clock, Taliek Brown put up a desperation heave from about thirty feet away with the shot clock running down to put the Huskies up 69–64, and they never looked back. 

Brandin Knight had a chance to win it for Pittsburgh at the end of the first overtime. After slipping and injuring his right knee, just as they tied the game at 52, Knight was clearly in pain. However, with 1.7 seconds left in OT, he checked into the game and put up a 40-foot 3-point attempt that would have won the game. It bounced off the rim and the game went to double OT.

Knight's eight assists tied him at 229 for the school record in a season. He had fifteen points in the loss. Ontario Lett, who tied the game with 23 seconds left in overtime, had 17 in the loss.

Butler finished with 23 points for Uconn in the win, while Brown added 13. It was the fifth Big East tournament championship for the Huskies, their last coming in 1999, when they went on to win the national championship. It was their sixth title game appearance in the last eight years. The game was the second-longest title game in league history. Syracuse beat Villanova 83–80 in three overtimes in 1981.

Awards
Dave Gavitt Trophy (Most Valuable Player): Caron Butler, Connecticut

All Tournament Team
 Marcus Barnes, Miami
 Caron Butler, Connecticut
 Ben Gordon, Connecticut
 Brandin Knight, Pittsburgh
 Ontario Lett, Pittsburgh
 Chris Thomas, Notre Dame

External links 
Big East website

References 

Tournament
Big East men's basketball tournament
Basketball in New York City
College sports in New York City
Sports competitions in New York City
Sports in Manhattan
Big East men's basketball tournament
Big East men's basketball tournament
2000s in Manhattan
Madison Square Garden